Stian Sivertzen (born 28 March 1989) is a Norwegian snowboarder. He represents Kongsberg IF.

He placed eighth overall in the 2007-08 Snowboarding World Cup, and second in his special event boardercross, where he collected all of his 4180 points. He took his first victory in a World Cup event in September 2007, and has four podiums so far.

References

 FIS bio
 X Games bio
 WSF bio

External links 
 
 

1989 births
Living people
Norwegian male snowboarders
People from Kongsberg
Snowboarders at the 2010 Winter Olympics
Snowboarders at the 2014 Winter Olympics
Olympic snowboarders of Norway
Kongsberg IF
X Games athletes
Sportspeople from Viken (county)
21st-century Norwegian people